Bauyrzhan Momyshuly, also spelled Baurjan Momish-Uli (Bauyrjan Momyşūly; Russified: Бауыржан Момышулы;  – 10 June 1982) was a Kazakh-Soviet military officer and author, posthumously awarded with the titles Hero of the Soviet Union and People's Hero of Kazakhstan.

Biography

Early life 
Momyshuly was born in Orak Balga, a now abandoned Aul in the modern Zhualy District in southern Kazakhstan, to a family of nomadic herders from the Dulat tribe. He lived with his relatives until the age of thirteen, but spent his teenage years in Soviet boarding schools. After completing his secondary education in 1929, he worked as a teacher, a secretary of a district committee and as an assistant-prosecutor. He was later employed as a department chief in the Kazakh ASSR's Central Agency for Economic Planning.

In November 1932, Momyshuly was conscripted for a two-year service in the Red Army, and posted as a cadet in the 14th Mountain Infantry Regiment. After his discharge, he studied a course in economics in the Leningrad Institute of Finance and worked in the Kazakh branch of the Commercial-Industrial Soviet State Bank.

Military career 
On 25 March 1936, Momyshuly was again called for military service, becoming a platoon commander in the Central Asian Military District's 315th Regiment. He remained in the military for the next two decades. In March 1937, the regiment was transferred to the Far Eastern Front in Siberia. While not subject to repression during the Great Purge, the remark "unreliable, with extreme nationalist views" was inscribed in his personal dossier in 1937. His biographer, Mekemtas Myrzakhmetov, believed this happened because Momyshuly was known to read the poetry of Magzhan Zhumabayev and works of other authors associated with the Alash Orda.

In 1939, Momyshuly was assigned to command the 105th Infantry Division's artillery. From February 1940, he headed the 202nd Independent Anti-Tank Battalion, based in Zhytomyr.

In January the following year, Lieutenant Momyshuly returned to Kazakhstan, serving in Alma-Ata's military commissariat. When Germany invaded the Soviet Union on 22 June, he was appointed a battalion commander – Kombat – in the 1073rd Regiment of the newly formed 316th Rifle Division, headed by the military commissar of the Kyrgyz SSR, Major General Ivan Panfilov.

World War II 
In September 1941, the division was sent to the front in Malaya Vishera, at the vicinity of Leningrad. During October, as the Wehrmacht advanced on Moscow, the 316th – now part of General Konstantin Rokossovsky's 16th Army – was transferred to the theater and tasked with defending the highway passing through the city of Volokolamsk and the surrounding area. Momyshuly's battalion was assigned an eight-kilometer-long sector along the Ruza River; Senior Lieutenant Momyshuly took part in 27 engagements during the defense of the Soviet capital. From the 16 to 18 November, he and his unit were cut off from the rest of the division in the village of Matryonino, yet managed to hold off the German forces and eventually broke out back to their lines. For its performances, the 316th was awarded the status of a Guards formation on 23 November, and named the Panfilov 8th Guards Rifle Division in honor of its fallen commander, who was killed in action on 18 November. In late November, Momyshuly was promoted to the rank of captain.

Momyshuly participated in the Soviet counter-offensive and was severely wounded on 5 December, though he declined to be evacuated to receive treatment.

In March 1942, war correspondent Alexander Bek arrived in the 8th Guards Division. During the spring of that year, Bek convinced Momyshuly, who was reluctant at first, to cooperate with him in writing a novel about the fighting in Volokolamsk, which would eventually be published in 1944 under the title Volokolamsk Highway. Momyshuly strongly disapproved of Bek's book, which he claimed to be an unrealistic depiction of events, and criticized the author relentlessly for the remainder of his life.
    
In April 1942, his commanding officer approved his promotion to the rank of major. In August 1942, his superiors had submitted a highly positive report on his conduct, and he was recommended to be awarded the title Hero of the Soviet Union. The proposal was rejected. The poet Mikhail Isinaliev, a friend of Momyshuly, wrote that a former political officer from the 8th Guards told him that this was due to his Kazakh patriotism, which was regarded as dangerous nationalism by the unit's commissars. Momyshuly joined the Communist Party during the same year. In October, he was promoted to the rank of lieutenant colonel. After eight months, he became a colonel.

During 1943, due to the effects of his old injury, he was forced to rest in a hospital for a prolonged period. After being released from the hospital in March 1944, he underwent an advanced officers' course in the Voroshilov Academy. On 21 January 1945, Colonel Baurzhan Momyshuly was appointed as the commander of the 9th Guards Rifle Division, a unit of the 2nd Guards Rifle Corps in the 1st Baltic Front's 6th Guards Army. The 9th participated in the East Prussian Offensive, taking fifteen towns near the city of Priekule. After the war ended, Momyshuly was awarded the Order of Lenin.

Post-war years 
In 1946, Momyshuly entered the Voroshilov Academy again. On 16 June 1948, the Kazakh SSR's Council of Ministers appointed him as chief of the republic's Voluntary Society for Cooperation with the Armed Forces, while he still served in the military. In late 1948, he became deputy commander of the 49th Independent Infantry Brigade in the East Siberian Military District. From 1950, he served as a senior lecturer in the Red Army's Military Academy of Logistics and Transport. According to Myrzakhmetov, he was the only one of the 500 officers who graduated with him to never receive the rank of a General; the author claimed this was due to a political decision to deny Turkic people a high status in the Soviet Armed Forces.

In 1955, Colonel Momyshuly retired from the army due an illness. He turned to a literary career, writing several novels as well as books about his wartime experiences. He was also a lecturer in the Kazakhstan Academy of Sciences.

In 1963, at the invitation of Raúl Castro, Colonel Momyshuly travelled to Cuba, where he lectured members of the Cuban Revolutionary Armed Forces on tactics.

Momyshuly is mainly known due his appearance in Bek's Volokolamsk Highway. The author wrote two sequels, Several Days and General Panfilov's Reserve. The series gained international, as well as Soviet, recognition.

Momyshuly's book about the 1941 battles in Volokolamsk, Moscow is Behind Us, was adapted to cinema during 1967. In 1976, he won the Kazakh SSR's Abay Qunanbayuli State Prize for his autobiography, Our Family.

Momyshuly opposed the Brezhnevite establishment's exaltation of the battle of Malaya Zemlya; according to his son and biographer, Bahytzhan, his position made him powerful enemies in the state apparatus, and nullified his chances to receive the title Hero of the Soviet Union while alive. 
When Isinaliev approached Dinmukhamed Konayev and requested him to arrange for Momyshuly to become one such, the First Secretary replied that as long as General Alexei Yepishev was the head of the Red Army's Main Political Directorate, the decoration would never be bestowed. Bahytzhan also recalled that in his later years, his father – who was a "loosely practicing Muslim" all his life – turned to Sufism. Momyshuly died in 1982 and was buried in Alma Ata.

Shortly before the collapse of the USSR, the chief of the Kazakh Supreme Soviet, Nursultan Nazarbayev, had managed to convince the authorities in Moscow to posthumously grant Momyshuly the country's highest military honor, and he was declared a Hero of the Soviet Union on 11 December 1990. After the republic became independent, he was also made a People's Hero of Kazakhstan. The capital of his native Zhualy District, Bauyrzhan Momyshuly, is named after him. The Almaty Zhas Ulan Republican School is also named in his honor.

Today, the Center for Bauyrzhan Studies is located at the Taraz State Pedagogical Institute in Taraz, Kazakhstan. The Center is home to a wide variety of Russian and Kazakh sources on the life and times of Bauyrzhan Momyshuly.

On November 26, 2022, the Military Unit 5571 of the National Guard of Kazakhstan in the center of Almaty was named after Momyshuly.

Books 

Moscow Behind Us ( «За нами Москва»)
Our General, Ivan Panfilov («Наш генерал»)
One Night's Tale («История одной ночи»)
Our Family
The Officer's Diary («Дневник офицера»)
Psychology of War: Part 1 («Психология войны: 1 часть»)
Psychology of War: Part 2 («Психология войны: 2 часть»)
Meetings in Cuba («Кубинские встречи»)

Media
Bauyrzhan Momyshuly has been depicted by the following actors in film and television productions:
 Asanbek Umuraliyev in the 1968 picture Moscow is Behind Us.
 Boris Scherbakov in the 1984 TV mini-series Volokolamsk Highway.

In 2010, Kazakhfilm Studio released the documentary Legendary Bauyrzhan («Қазақтың Бауыржаны»), directed by Kalila Umarov.

In 2013, released TV mini-series named "Bauyrzhan Momyshuly" by famous director of Kazakhstan Akan Satayev.

References

Annotations

External links 

An article about Momyshuly's 100th anniversary celebrations.
An article on the 2010 Kazakh documentary film Bauyrzhan Momyshuly.
, on director Kalila Umarov's YouTube channel.

Dughlats
1910 births
1982 deaths
People from Jambyl Region
People from Syr-Darya Oblast
Kazakhstani military personnel
Soviet military personnel of World War II
Communist Party of the Soviet Union members
Kazakhstani writers
Soviet writers
Military Academy of the General Staff of the Armed Forces of the Soviet Union alumni
Heroes of the Soviet Union
Heroes of Kazakhstan
Soviet Muslims